Nothofagus solandri var. cliffortioides, commonly called mountain beech, is a species of Southern beech tree and is endemic to New Zealand. Mountain beech grows in mountainous regions at high altitudes. In New Zealand the taxon is called Fuscospora cliffortioides. Nothofagus solandri var. cliffortioides occupies a wider range of habitat than any other New Zealand tree species and it shows a corresponding range of life form, seeding habits, regenerative patterns, growth habits, growth rates, stand replacement and mortality patterns.

It also has leaves that are elongated and have a pointed end.

Hybrids 
 Mountain beech is known to hybridise with black beech (Nothofagus solandri var. solandri) where the two species co-exist, and in some places the hybrids may form complex introgressive hybrid swarms.
 Mountain beech also hybridises with red beech (Nothofagus fusca) to form the hybrid species Nothofagus × blairii.

References

External links
 University of Waikato: Nothofagus

Nothofagaceae
Endemic flora of New Zealand
Trees of New Zealand
Garden plants of New Zealand
Ornamental trees